The Valley Forge Invitational was a tournament on the Symetra Tour, the LPGA's developmental tour. It was part of the Symetra Tour's schedule between 2018 and 2019. 

It was held at Raven's Claw Golf Club in Pottstown, Pennsylvania.

Winners

References

External links

Former Symetra Tour events
Golf in Pennsylvania